Yangiyoʻl is a district-level in Uzbekistan's Tashkent Region, 20 km from the city of Tashkent. It has a population of 61,700 people.  Industry in the area includes textiles and paper.

The largest factories and plants in the city: Confectionery Factory, Bio-chemical Plant, Oil Plant, Wine plant, Paper Factory, Brick Production Plant, Canned Food Plant.  Some of the factories and plants are in great need of investments. There are 18 schools, 3 colleges and 1 academic lyceum in this city. All the other city facilities, such as a park, a cinema, restaurants, bars and cafes are also available for the people living in that area.

References

Populated places in Tashkent Region
Cities in Uzbekistan